Marcos Antônio dos Santos (born 15 November 1979), known as Marcos Antônio, is a Brazilian footballer who plays for Bonsucesso Futebol Clube as a striker.

Club career
Born in Rio de Janeiro, Marcos Antônio spent seven years of his professional career in Portugal, playing for C.D. Aves, G.D. Estoril Praia, A.D. Sanjoanense, U.D. Oliveirense (two spells), Boavista F.C. and C.D. Trofense.

He appeared in the top division with Boavista, starting in only one game in the 2006–07 season (182 minutes of action overall). Four of the other six years were spent in the second level.

References

1979 births
Living people
Footballers from Rio de Janeiro (city)
Brazilian footballers
Association football forwards
Campeonato Brasileiro Série B players
Clube de Regatas Brasil players
Madureira Esporte Clube players
Duque de Caxias Futebol Clube players
Bangu Atlético Clube players
Primeira Liga players
Liga Portugal 2 players
Segunda Divisão players
C.D. Aves players
G.D. Estoril Praia players
A.D. Sanjoanense players
U.D. Oliveirense players
Boavista F.C. players
C.D. Trofense players
Brazilian expatriate footballers
Expatriate footballers in Portugal
Brazilian expatriate sportspeople in Portugal